Dimitrios Skourtis (1934 – 2000) was a Greek hurdler. He competed in the men's 400 metres hurdles at the 1960 Summer Olympics.

References

1934 births
2000 deaths
Athletes (track and field) at the 1960 Summer Olympics
Greek male hurdlers
Olympic athletes of Greece
Place of birth missing